Sha Chau Lei is a village in Ha Tsuen, Yuen Long District, Hong Kong.

Administration
For electoral purposes, Sha Chau Lei is part of the Ha Tsuen constituency.

References

External links

 Delineation of area of existing village Sha Chau Lei (I) (Ha Tsuen) for election of resident representative (2019 to 2022)
 Delineation of area of existing village Sha Chau Lei (II) (Ha Tsuen) for election of resident representative (2019 to 2022)

Villages in Yuen Long District, Hong Kong
Ha Tsuen